Blackburn with Darwen is a borough and unitary authority area in Lancashire, North West England. It consists of the industrial town of Blackburn and the market town of Darwen including other villages around the two towns.

Formation
It was founded in 1974 as the Lancashire borough of Blackburn, from the County Borough of Blackburn, the Borough of Darwen, parts of Turton Urban District (chiefly the villages of Belmont, Chapeltown and Edgworth) and parts of Blackburn Rural District. It was renamed in May 1997, in preparation for a split from Lancashire County Council. On 1 April 1998 it became a unitary authority.

Demographics

Ethnicity
According to the 2017 census, the proportion of Muslims is 30.9%. 20.4% of the district's population belongs to any South Asian ethnic group, making it the highest percentage in the region, and almost four times higher than national average of South Asians.

Religion
According to the 2021 census, 35.0% of the population was Muslim, 38.0% Christian, 0.3% Hindu, 0.2% Buddhist, 0.4% followed another religions (including Judaism, Sikhism and others), 21.1% were not affiliated to a religion and 5.0% did not state their religious views.

Local elections

Following boundary changes in 2018, there are currently 51 seats on the council (decreased from 64), with the borough divided into 17 wards (decreased from 23). The wards are: Audley and Queens Park, Bastwell and Daisyfield, Billinge and Beardwood, Blackburn Central, Blackburn South and Lower Darwen, Blackburn South East, Darwen East, Darwen South, Darwen West, Ewood, Little Harwood with Whitebirk, Livesey with Pleasington, Mill Hill and Moorgate, Roe Lee, Shear Brow and Corporation Park, Wensley Fold, and West Pennine.

|-
!colspan=2|Parties
!Seats
|-
| 
|37
|-
| 
|13
|-
| 
|1
|-
!colspan=2|Total!!51
|}
The council was shaken in 2004 when six Labour councillors quit the ruling group one month after an election and became independent representatives, and the council temporarily fell into no overall control. The councillors, who eventually re-joined the party, left over an internal row reportedly sparked by the demotion of particular councillors in a post-election reshuffle. Allegations of vote-rigging and corruption have dogged the council, with members of the Muslim community reportedly being "strong-armed by mosque leaders and councillors to vote Labour" during elections. The possibility of corruption has been eased by reforms to postal voting which have made electoral fraud "childishly simple" in the UK according to a European watchdog. The number of postal votes registered in Blackburn in 2005 was 20,000, compared to 7,600 in 2001. In April 2005, local councillor Mohammed Hussain was jailed for three years for rigging the 2002 town hall election by stealing at least 230 postal vote ballots in his ward.

The local elections of May 2007 saw a coalition of parties take control of the council from Labour. The small For Darwen party and independents held the fine balance of power on the council in a partnership with the Conservatives and Liberal Democrats. Like its predecessor, the ruling administration also attracted controversy; one of its councillors being suspended following a conviction for benefit fraud and another following allegations of domestic abuse. Tensions over the presence of former England First Party member Michael Johnson within the coalition as part of For Darwen rose to the surface when Johnson was quoted in The Sun newspaper in October 2007 blaming his unemployment on "all the immigrants flooding this country." Three weeks before local elections in May 2008, a Liberal Democrat candidate for Shear Brow ward caused a stir by defecting to Labour.

In 2010, two For Darwen Party councillors resigned and withdrew their support for the coalition, and after a vote of no confidence the Labour Party regained control of the council. In 2011 Labour gained control of the council.

Economy
This is a chart of trend of regional gross value added of Blackburn with Darwen at current basic prices published (pp. 240–253) by Office for National Statistics with figures in millions of British Pounds Sterling.

Settlements

Civil parishes

Darwen (town council)
Eccleshill
Livesey
North Turton
Pleasington
Tockholes
Yate and Pickup Bank
The town of Blackburn and the village of Hoddlesden lie in unparished areas.

Education

As a unitary authority, Blackburn with Darwen authority has a statutory responsibility for educational standards and schooling within its boundaries.

Transport

Blackburn with Darwen Council has a stated transport policy of "making roads traffic free".

Freedom of the Borough
The following people and military units have received the Freedom of the Borough of Blackburn with Darwen.

Individuals
 Barbara Castle: 23 November 1979.
 Sir Charles Fletcher-Cooke: 23 November 1979.
 Tom Taylor, Baron Taylor of Blackburn: 2 April 1992.
 Jack Straw: 1 October 2015.

Military Units
 The East Lancashire Regiment: 5 February 1948.
 The Lancashire Regiment: 6 November 1958.
 The Queen's Lancashire Regiment: 25 March 1970.
 The Duke of Lancaster's Regiment: 1 July 2006.

See also 
 Blackburn with Darwen Teaching Primary Care Trust

Notes

References

External links
Blackburn with Darwen Council
 Blackburn with Darwen council news
 Blackburn Muslim Association : Serving the community

Council political parties
Blackburn Conservative Association
For Darwen Party
Blackburn Labour Party
Blackburn with Darwen Liberal Democrats

 
1974 establishments in England
Local government in Blackburn with Darwen
NUTS 3 statistical regions of the United Kingdom
Unitary authority districts of England
Local government districts of Lancashire
Boroughs in England